Gong HanLin (born 20 October 1957) is a Chinese actor and xiangsheng performer and sketch comedy performer.

Gong is notable for performing sketch comedy in CCTV New Year's Gala since 1990.

Biography
Gong was born in Shenyang, Liaoning on October 20, 1957 to actor parents.

After graduating from Shenyang Normal University he was assigned to Shenyang Troupe, he studied xiangsheng under Tang Jiezhong.

Gong started to perform xiangsheng and sketch comedy in 1986.

He frequently performed on stage with the famous Zhao Lirong prior to her death.

Personal life
Gong married Jin Zhu, who is also a Chinese actress.

Works

CCTV New Year's Gala

Film

Television

Awards
 Sparkling Fox - 44th Berlin International Film Festival - Honourable Mention

References

External links

1957 births
Male actors from Shenyang
Shenyang Normal University alumni
Living people
Male actors from Liaoning
Chinese male film actors
Chinese male television actors
Chinese male voice actors
Chinese male stage actors